Cobaw is a locality in the Macedon Ranges Shire, in Victoria, situated on Dry Creek. The Cobaw area formerly had its own Post Office and State school, now closed.  Cobaw Post Office opened on 1 December 1887 and closed in 1952. The Cobaw Range is a section of the Great Dividing Range north of the settlement, running roughly east–west. The ranges are mainly granitic and reach a maximum height of 760m. Most of the western parts of this range are within the boundaries of the Cobaw State Forest.  In the 2016 censes Cobaw had a population of 70.

References

Towns in Victoria (Australia)
Shire of Macedon Ranges